Sunil Saigal, is an Indian-born American engineer.

Education
Saigal obtained his bachelor's degree (Civil Engineering) at Punjab Engineering College, Chandigarh, India in 1978, obtaining a masters in Structures from Indian Institute of Science in 1980, and obtained his PhD in 1985 from Purdue University.

Career
Sunil Saigal is a distinguished professor and a former dean of the Newark College of Engineering at New Jersey Institute of Technology.

Saigal's research has been focused on interactions with the industry and these contributions have included: 
 development of boundary element shape optimization in collaboration with United Technologies
 formulations for powder packing in collaboration with Alcoa and DuPont
 development of computational models for nonlinear soil behaviour in collaboration with ANSYS
  cohesive element formulations for post crack behaviour of glass—polymer composites in collaboration with DuPont 
 explicit algorithms for high velocity impact in collaboration with Naval Surface Warfare Center
 computational simulations of acetabular hip component to assist with total hip replacement surgery in a collaboration with University of Pittsburgh Medical Center
 development of medial surface algorithms in collaboration with Sandia National Laboratories.

Awards
 Fellow of American Society of Mechanical Engineers (ASME).
 Fellow of American Society of Civil Engineers (ASCE)
 Fellow of American Association for the Advancement of Science (AAAS).
 Orr Award for best paper, ASME Materials Division, 2004.
 Who's Who in America, 57th Edition, November 2002.
 Richard Teare Award for Excellence in Engineering Education, Carnegie Institute of Technology, Carnegie Mellon University, 1996.
 Outstanding Professor of the Year, ASCE Pittsburgh Section, 1994.
 George Tallman Ladd Research Award, Carnegie Mellon University, 1990.
 Presidential Young Investigator Award, National Science Foundation, 1990-1995.
 Ralph R. Teetor Award, Society of Automotive Engineers, 1988.
 The Admiral Ralph Earle Medal, Worcester Engineer Society, 1987.

References

Living people
Year of birth missing (living people)
Indian emigrants to the United States
New Jersey Institute of Technology faculty
Punjab Engineering College alumni